= Devakar Falls =

Devakar Falls also called Vajra Falls or Devamala Falls is a water falls located in Uttara Kannada District, Karnataka, India and it is visible from Devakar village. There are no well developed road to reach the water falls and during rainy season it is not possible to reach. The height of water falls is about 200 meters and after falling the water reaches Kadra reservoir. During October there will be more water in the water falls when compared to water volume during February.
